Beverley Wang is a Canadian Australian broadcaster, radio producer and journalist. As of 2022, she was host of two programs on ABC Radio National and an executive producer. She is also the originator and host of It's Not a Race, an ABC podcast dealing with issues of race and identity in Australian culture.

Life and career

Early life and career 
Wang was born in Vancouver, Canada, to a Taiwanese Canadian family who had emigrated to the country in the 1970s. The second of four children, she has described herself growing up as "an angry, 90s, grunge teenager, seeing all the injustice in the world." Though her parents were not wealthy, they sent her to an elite private school where many of the students were from wealthy backgrounds, an experience that honed her consciousness of "differences and divisions" in society.

Wang showed an early aptitude for writing, becoming an editor of her high school newspaper. After graduating from university, she became an English teacher in Japan before being accepted in 2002 into journalism school at New York University. She thereafter served a number of internships with New York media outlets, most notably with the New York Daily News, which gave her a first taste of the intensity of daily news reporting. Her first journalism job was with The Journal News, a New York regional newspaper, where she worked for less than a year before becoming a reporter for Associated Press.

ABC career 

Wang emigrated to Australia in 2009, where she secured a job with the Australian Broadcasting Corporation as an online news reporter, focusing on the Asia-Pacific region and current affairs. When the network offered her a role as a stand-in radio producer, she readily agreed, though lacking any broadcasting experience. After a two-day training course, she went on to produce live programs for Radio Australia, ABC NewsRadio and Radio National, before eventually establishing herself as executive producer of the latter's RN Drive program.

As of 2022, Wang had several roles with Radio National, including co-host and producer of RN's Stop Everything!, a program focusing on issues raised by pop culture, and the host on Fridays of Life Matters, a morning magazine program exploring social issues. In 2016, Wang started her own podcast, It's Not a Race, which deals with questions of race and identity in Australian culture. The podcast has generally been well received, particularly by Australian people of colour. According to The Guardian Naaman Zhou, the podcast has made Wang a "lightning rod" for racial debate in the country.

Controversies

Symons interview 
In 2017, a colleague of Wang's at the ABC, Radio 774 morning presenter Red Symons, interviewed Wang about her then-new podcast It's Not a Race. Symons, known for his mock-hostile persona, began by asking her "what's the deal with Asians?", "are they all the same?", "are you yellow? (see, you're not!)", and questioning whether her real name was "Beverley". When portions of the pre-recorded interview went to air, it immediately drew complaints and was quickly removed from the ABC website. Symons later apologized, saying "I came across as racist and I was wrong in the way I conducted the interview", adding "this is not who I am".

Bluey 
In 2021, Wang wrote an article about Bluey, a popular Australian children's cartoon series in which the characters are dogs. While praising the show as "tender, nuanced and joyful", she continued: "As a parent of colour, I am always conscious of the presence — or absence — of diverse representation in kids' pop culture, what it means for children and the conversations we have around that ... Where are the disabled, queer, poor, gender diverse, dogs of colour and single-parent dog families in Bluey's Brisbane?" While Wang received support for her comments in some quarters, she also experienced a social media backlash. Evan Mulholland, of the conservative Institute of Public Affairs, commented that “most Australians would see it as a weird take to see Bluey through the prism of identity politics when it’s just a wholesome cartoon.” Wang responded to the backlash by noting that her article had been largely intended as a love letter to the program, and saying “it just goes to show that politics are everywhere, and representation matters.”

On reporting 

Wang has spoken about the challenges of on-the-beat reporting, in particular, of having to interview people at difficult times in their lives, such as after bereavements. The reporter is caught in the situation of, on the one hand, being required to get the interview, while on the other, trying to show empathy and sensitivity to the interviewee. She notes that “[p]eople don’t really talk to you about that in journalism school, the fact that you are going to have to do really hard things that might make you feel bad and might make other people feel bad". The stress of breaking news reporting was a contributing factor toward her eventually seeking other areas of work in her chosen field.

References 

Australian broadcasters
Australian journalists
Australian women podcasters
Canadian emigrants to Australia
Living people
Year of birth missing (living people)